The white-rumped swiftlet (Aerodramus spodiopygius) is a species of swift in the family Apodidae.

It is found in American Samoa, Fiji, New Caledonia, Papua New Guinea, Samoa, Solomon Islands, Tonga, and Vanuatu. Birds in Australia are now treated as a separate species, Australian swiftlet (Aerodramus terraereginae).

Its natural habitats are subtropical or tropical moist lowland forests, subtropical or tropical moist montane forests, and rocky areas.

References

External links
Image at ADW

Aerodramus
Birds of Fiji
Birds of Polynesia
Birds described in 1848
Taxonomy articles created by Polbot
Taxa named by Titian Peale